Robert C. Ludwig (born c. 1945) is an American mastering engineer. He has mastered recordings on all the major recording formats for all the major record labels, and on projects by more than 1,300 artists including Led Zeppelin, Lou Reed, Queen, Jimi Hendrix, Bryan Ferry, Paul McCartney, Nirvana, Bruce Springsteen and Daft Punk
resulting in over 3,000 credits. He is the recipient of numerous Grammy and TEC Awards.

Biography

At the age of eight in South Salem, New York, Ludwig was so fascinated with his first tape recorder, that he used to make recordings of whatever was on the radio. Ludwig is a classical musician by training, having obtained his bachelor's and master's degrees from the Eastman School of Music of the University of Rochester in New York. He was also involved in the sound department at Eastman, as well as being principal trumpet of the Utica Symphony Orchestra. Inspired by Phil Ramone when he came to Eastman to teach a summer recording workshop, Ludwig ended up working as his assistant. Afterwards, he was contacted and offered work with Ramone at A&R Recording. Together, they did sessions on projects with The Band, Peter, Paul & Mary, Neil Diamond and Frank Sinatra.

After a few years at A&R, Ludwig received an offer from Sterling Sound, where he eventually became a vice president. After seven years at Sterling, he moved to its competitor, Masterdisk, where he was vice president and chief engineer. In December 1992, Ludwig left Masterdisk to start his own record mastering facility in Portland, Maine, named Gateway Mastering Studios, Inc. He, along with Adam Ayan are the two mastering engineers who work at Gateway Mastering.

Work
Ludwig's mastering credits include albums for many major classic artists, such as the Kronos Quartet, and rock acts, including Jimi Hendrix, Phish,  Rush, Mötley Crüe, Megadeth, Metallica, Gloria Estefan, Nirvana, The Strokes, Queen, U2, Sting, The Police, Janet Jackson, Mariah Carey, Beck, Guns N' Roses, Richie Sambora, Tool, Simple Minds, Bryan Ferry, Tori Amos, Bonnie Raitt, Mark Knopfler, Leonard Cohen, David Bowie, Paul McCartney, Bruce Springsteen, the Bee Gees, Madonna, Richard Wood, Supertramp, Will Ackerman, Pet Shop Boys, Radiohead, Elton John, Daft Punk and Alabama Shakes.

He has occasionally undertaken larger projects, such as remastering the entire back catalogues of Rush, Dire Straits, Creedence Clearwater Revival and the Rolling Stones.

Ludwig cites his most musically satisfying projects as: the CD reissue of Music From Big Pink (The Band), There's a Riot Goin' On (Sly and the Family Stone), Led Zeppelin II, Painted from Memory (Bacharach & Costello), Spirit (Jewel), Loreena McKennitt, and Ancient Voices of Children (George Crumb).

Ludwig remains an active influence in the music industry. As a judge for the 8th and 10th-14th annual Independent Music Awards, his contributions helped assist the careers of upcoming independent artists. Ludwig is active in the Audio Engineering Society and is a past chairman of the New York AES section. He was Co-Chair of the Producers and Engineers Wing for 5 years and is presently on the Advisory Council of the P&E Wing of National Academy of Recording Arts and Sciences.

Awards and recognition

Grammy Awards

|-
|rowspan="1"|2003
|The Rising
|Album Of The Year
|
|-
|rowspan="1"|2005
|Avalon
|rowspan="3"|Best Surround Sound Album
|
|-
|rowspan="2"|2006
|Brothers In Arms - 20th Anniversary Edition
|
|-
|In Your Honor
|
|-
|2008
|Lorraine Hunt Lieberson Sings Peter Lieberson: Neruda Songs
|Best Classical Album
|
|-
|rowspan="2"|2009
|In Rainbows
|rowspan="2"|Album of the Year
|
|-
|Viva la Vida or Death and All His Friends
|
|-
|rowspan="2"|2012
|Layla and Other Assorted Love Songs (Super Deluxe Edition)
|Best Surround Sound Album
|
|-
|Music Is Better Than Words
|rowspan="3"|Best Engineered Album, Non-Classical
|
|-
|rowspan="4"|2013
|Ashes & Fire
|
|-
|Love Is a Four Letter Word
|
|-
|Babel
|rowspan="3"|Album of the Year
|
|-
|Blunderbuss
|
|-
|rowspan="5"|2014
|rowspan="2"|Random Access Memories
|
|-
|rowspan="2"|Best Engineered Album, Non-Classical
|
|-
|Annie Up 
|
|-
|"Get Lucky"
|Record of the Year
|
|-
|Charlie Is My Darling - Ireland 1965
|Best Historical Album
|
|-
|rowspan="5"|2015
|G I R L
|rowspan="2"|Album of the Year
|
|-
|rowspan="2"|Morning Phase
|
|-
|rowspan="2"|Best Engineered Album, Non-Classical
|
|-
|Bass & Mandolin
|
|-
|Beyoncé 
|Best Surround Sound Album
|
|-
|rowspan="2"|2016
|rowspan="2"|Sound & Color
|Album of the Year
|
|-
|rowspan="4"|Best Engineered Album, Non-Classical
|
|-
|rowspan="1"|2017
|Are You Serious
|
|-
|rowspan="1"|2018
|Is This the Life We Really Want?
|
|-
|rowspan="4"|2020
|Scenery
|
|-
|Riley: Sun Rings
|Best Engineered Album, Classical
|
|-
|Kverndokk: Symphonic Dances
|rowspan="2"|Best Immersive Audio Album
|
|-
|The Savior
|
|-
|2021
|Black Hole Rainbow
|Best Engineered Album, Non-Classical
|
|-
|rowspan="2"|2022
|Clique
|rowspan="2"|Best Immersive Audio Album
|
|-
|The Future Bites
|
|-
|2023
|Yankee Hotel Foxtrot (2022 Remaster)
|Best Historical Album
|
|-

APRS

2012: Association of Professional Recording Services Sound Fellowship - received 27 October 2012

Audio Engineering Society

2015: AES Gold Medal

References

External links 

SoundStage! interview

1940s births
Living people
American audio engineers
Engineers from New York (state)
Grammy Award winners
Latin Grammy Award winners
Mastering engineers
People from South Salem, New York
University of Rochester alumni